is a Japanese footballer who plays for Grulla Morioka.

Club statistics
Updated to 23 February 2020.

References

External links
Profile at Grulla Morioka

1991 births
Living people
Meiji University alumni
Association football people from Tokyo
Japanese footballers
J3 League players
YSCC Yokohama players
Iwate Grulla Morioka players
Tokyo United FC players
Association football forwards